Alain Ngamayama (born 23 May 1984) is a Polish retired footballer who played mostly as a centre-back.

Ngamayama was the captain of Warta Poznań for many years and was widely considered a club hero.

He was born to a Zairean father and Polish mother, however considers himself fully Polish having born in Greater Poland. He grew up in Poznań and began in Warta's youth teams. Despite the club's varying fortunes he stayed with them throughout his career, barring a short stint for one season early in his career, and in recent years as nearing retirement.

References

External links

 

1984 births
Living people
Footballers from Poznań
Polish footballers
Association football midfielders
Warta Poznań players
Polonia Środa Wielkopolska players
Polish people of Democratic Republic of the Congo descent